The governor of Indiana is the head of government of the U.S. state of Indiana. The governor is the head of the executive branch of Indiana's state government and is charged with enforcing state laws.

While a territory, Indiana had two governors appointed by the President of the United States. Since statehood in 1816, it has had 49 governors, serving 51 distinct terms; Isaac P. Gray and Henry F. Schricker are the only governors to have served non-consecutive terms. Four governors have served two four-year terms; territorial governor William Henry Harrison served for over 12 years. The shortest-serving governor is Henry Smith Lane, who served two days before resigning to become a U.S. Senator. The current governor is Eric Holcomb, who took office on January 9, 2017.

Governors

Governors of the Territory of Indiana
Indiana Territory was formed on July 4, 1800, from the Northwest Territory. Despite remaining a territory for nearly 16 years, it had only two governors appointed by the President of the United States before it became a state.

Governors of the State of Indiana
Indiana was admitted to the Union on December 11, 1816.

The original 1816 Constitution of Indiana provided for the election of a governor and a lieutenant governor every three years, limited to six years out of any nine-year period. The second and current constitution of 1851 lengthened terms to four years and set the commencement of the governor's term on the second Monday in the January following the election. Governors were allowed to serve for four years in any eight-year period, but a 1972 amendment permitted governors to serve for eight years in any twelve-year period. Should the office of governor become vacant, the lieutenant governor becomes governor. If the office of lieutenant governor is vacant, the president pro tempore of the Indiana Senate becomes governor; this has happened once, when James B. Ray succeeded William Hendricks.

See also
Gubernatorial lines of succession in the United States#Indiana

Notes

References

General

 
 
 
 
 
 
 
 
 

Constitutions

 
 
 

Specific

Lists of state governors of the United States

Governors